Saeed Al-Naqbi (Arabic:سعيد النقبي) (born 14 August 1980) is an Emirati footballer. He currently plays as a defender for Masafi.

Career
He formerly played for Dibba Al-Hisn, Dibba Al-Fujairah, Khor Fakkan, Al Bataeh, and Masafi.

External links

References

1980 births
Living people
Emirati footballers
Dibba Al-Hisn Sports Club players
Dibba FC players
Khor Fakkan Sports Club players
Al Bataeh Club players
Masafi Club players
UAE Pro League players
UAE First Division League players
Association football defenders
Place of birth missing (living people)